Liverpool Central High Level was a terminus railway station in central Liverpool, England. It opened on 1 March 1874, at the western end of the Cheshire Lines Committee (CLC) line to Manchester Central. It replaced Brunswick as the CLC's Liverpool passenger terminus, becoming the headquarters of the committee.

History
There were six platforms within the station, offering journeys to Manchester Central, London St. Pancras, Hull, Harwich, Stockport Tiviot Dale, Southport Lord Street and an alternative route to that of the Midland Railway terminating at London Marylebone. The journey to Manchester Central took 45 mins, making the route quicker and more direct than those of the competing Lancashire & Yorkshire Railway and London & North Western Railway.

On 11 January 1892, Liverpool Central Low Level underground station opened at the end of the Mersey Railway's route, via the Mersey Railway Tunnel from Birkenhead. The tunnel was extended from James Street to Central. The Mersey Railway platforms were underground, accessed from stairs within the station; these stairs were situated in roughly the same position as the escalators accessing the Merseyrail Northern Line today.

The station was always busy, until nationalisation. Route closures that were part of the Beeching Axe in the 1960s closed three terminal stations: Liverpool Central High Level, Liverpool Exchange and Woodside Station in Birkenhead.

 Long and medium distance routes – Lime Street Station in Liverpool city centre was to remain, absorbing the long-to-medium-distance passenger traffic of the closed terminal stations.
 Local urban routes – The local urban services served by the terminal stations would be absorbed by the new Merseyrail urban network.

New tunnels under Liverpool's city centre were scheduled to connect all the separate rail lines to create Merseyrail.

In 1966, most services on the CLC route were diverted to Lime Street via the Hunts Cross chord, leaving only a dozen urban commuter trains per day to and from the terminus at Gateacre. These final services were withdrawn on 17 April 1972, with the High Level part of the station closed that day; it was later demolished, after having served briefly as a car park. However, the Low Level underground station remains open.

The site was being developed into Central Village, building over the underground station; however, in 2017, new owners Augur announced that they planned to develop the site into a mixed retail and leisure development known as 'Circus'.

Layout

The station had six platforms, arranged over three islands. The island that formed platforms 1 and 2 was especially wide to allow vehicles to drive down the middle. Run-around loops were present between platforms 2 and 3; platforms 4 and 5; and east of platform 6.

References

Sources

External links

 Signalling Record Society - Track and signalling diagram of Liverpool Central High Level station, c.1889

Disused railway stations in Liverpool
Former Cheshire Lines Committee stations
Railway stations in Great Britain opened in 1874
Railway stations in Great Britain closed in 1972
Former buildings and structures in Liverpool